The guanacaste hummingbird or Alfero's hummingbird (Amazilia alfaroana) is a possibly extinct species of hummingbird known only from a holotype collected in 1895 at the Miravalles Volcano in Costa Rica.

Taxonomy
It is usually treated as a subspecies of the Indigo-capped hummingbird or a hybrid between two unknown hummingbird species, but analysis of the holotype suggests it is its own species.

Conservation
It is possibly extinct, but the ecological stability of the area where the specimen was found indicates a possible undiscovered population still existing. The IUCN classifies it as critically endangered.

References 

Controversial hummingbird taxa
Amazilia
Endemic birds of Costa Rica
Birds described in 1896
Species known from a single specimen